Sávio Moreira de Oliveira (born 10 April 2004), known as Sávio or Savinho, is a Brazilian professional footballer who plays as a forward for Eredivisie club PSV, on loan from Ligue 1 club Troyes.

Club career

Early career 
Born in São Mateus, Espírito Santo, Sávio joined Atlético Mineiro's youth setup in 2018. He signed his first professional contract on 18 June 2020, agreeing to a three-year deal with a release clause of €60 million.

Altético Mineiro 
On 19 September 2020, Sávio made his professional debut for Atlético, playing in the final ten minutes of the team's 4–3 away win over Atlético Goianiense in the Série A. On 19 May 2022, he scored his first goal as a professional, the last in a 3–1 Copa Libertadores home win over Independiente del Valle.

Troyes 
On 30 June 2022, Atlético announced an agreement with the City Football Group for the transfer of Sávio, set at €6.5 million, with another €6 million in variables. He was initially assigned to Troyes.

Loan to PSV 
On 22 July 2022, Sávio joined PSV on loan for the 2022–23 season.

International career
Sávio was a member of the Brazil U15s winning team at the 2019 South American U-15 Championship, scoring four goals.

Career statistics

Honours
Atlético Mineiro
Campeonato Brasileiro Série A: 2021
Copa do Brasil: 2021
Campeonato Mineiro: 2020, 2021, 2022
Supercopa do Brasil: 2022

PSV
Johan Cruyff Shield: 2022

Brazil U15
South American U-15 Championship: 2019

References

External links

2004 births
Living people
Sportspeople from Espírito Santo
Brazilian footballers
Association football forwards
Campeonato Brasileiro Série A players
Eredivisie players
Eerste Divisie players
Clube Atlético Mineiro players
ES Troyes AC players
PSV Eindhoven players
Jong PSV players
Brazil youth international footballers
Brazil under-20 international footballers
Brazilian expatriate footballers
Brazilian expatriate sportspeople in France
Expatriate footballers in France
Brazilian expatriate sportspeople in the Netherlands
Expatriate footballers in the Netherlands